Abarema callejasii is a species of plant in the family Fabaceae. It is endemic to the east slope of the Cordillera Central in Antioquia, Colombia. It is a small tree found in montane rainforests.

References

callejasii
Vulnerable plants
Endemic flora of Colombia
Taxonomy articles created by Polbot
Taxa named by James Walter Grimes
Taxa named by Rupert Charles Barneby